Inglês de Sousa (born Herculano Marcos Inglês de Sousa) was a Brazilian lawyer, professor, journalist, and novelist. He was born in Óbidos, PA, on December 28, 1853, and died in Rio de Janeiro, RJ, on September 6, 1918. He was one of the founder members of the Academia Brasileira de Letras, and was the first occupant of Chair nº 28, which had as its patron Manuel Antônio de Almeida. He also served as treasurer of the new Academia. He was succeeded to his chair by Xavier Marques.

References

Brazilian writers
1853 births
1918 deaths